"OVER" is a single by Hey! Say! JUMP, released on June 29, 2011. In its first week, "OVER" sold 265,390 copies, over 18,000 more than the first week sales of their single "Ultra Music Power" in 2007, which remains Hey! Say! JUMP's highest selling single to date. It was certified Platinum by the Recording Industry Association of Japan.

"OVER" was released in three versions: two limited CD+DVD editions and a regular CD-only edition.

Regular Edition
CD
 "OVER"
 "Aiing: Aishiteru"
 "You Got More" - Hey! Say! 7
 "Screw" - Hey! Say! BEST
 "OVER" (Original Karaoke)
 "Aiing: Aishiteru" (Original Karaoke)
 "You Got More" (Original Karaoke) - Hey! Say! 7
 "Screw" (Original Karaoke) - Hey! Say! BEST

Limited Edition 1
CD
 "OVER"
 "OVER" (Original Karaoke)
 
DVD
 "OVER" (PV & Making of)

Limited Edition 2
CD
 "OVER"
 "Born in the EARTH"
 
DVD
 "Aiing: Aishiteru" (Video Clip)

Charts and certifications

Sales and certifications

References

Hey! Say! JUMP songs
2011 singles
Oricon Weekly number-one singles
Billboard Japan Hot 100 number-one singles